is a series of novels about Junkers (pronounced Yoon-kers), a miniature schnauzer,  language-speaking dog, written by Japanese musician Naoto Kine as a member of TM Network since 1990.

Media

Anime
An anime movie about a girl, Hiromi Nozawa, directed by Junichi Sato of Sailor Moon fame and shown in small chunks on Japanese TV before being released theatrically. The original author, kine also performed the film's opening song and acted in the film as Shintaro, Hiromi's father.  The late Kazuo Komatsubara also worked on the film as a character designer and animation director. It won Best Animation Film at the 1995 Mainichi Film Awards.

Hiromi appears on the outside to be a mature, resilient girl, but on the inside she feels like she's falling apart.  She hardly sees her parents at all, as they are always busy with work.  Then she learns that her parents are considering a divorce and she may have to make the heartrending choice of deciding which parent to live with.  On top of that, Hiromi's tutor, Keisuke (on whom Hiromi has a crush), is getting married, and Hiromi fears that she soon will be completely alone.  She finds herself comforted by Junkers, an unusual dog with the ability to speak and grant her three wishes.

Cast 
Japanese voice actor
Mei Oshitani as Hiromi Nozawa
Shinnosuke Furumoto as Junkers
Daisuke Sugata as Atsushi
Hiroko Takahashi as School Crossing Warden
Kappei Yamaguchi as Passenger
Katsunari Mineno as Keisuke Kimura 
Keiko Nakajima as Fumie Morita 
Mayumi Iizuka as Kazuko
Misako Konno as Suzuko Nozawa 
Mitsuaki Madono as Waiter
Momoko Ishi as Chie Harada
Naoto Kine as Shintaro Nozawa 
Sakiko Tamagawa as Yoko Inoue 
Toshihiko Nakajima as Photographer
Yuki Sato as Baby
Yuta Yamazaki as Hiroshi
Yuya Tejima as Takashi
English dubbing actor
Brittney Wilson as Hiromi Nozawa
Sanders Whiting as Junkers
Brad Swaile as Keisuke Kimura
Chantal Strand as Kazuko
Danny McKinnon as Takashi
Ellen Kennedy as Fumie Morita
Farell Spence as School Crossing Warden
Jordan Kilik as Atsushi
Lisa Ann Beley as Suzuko Nozawa
Moneca Stori as Yoko Inoue
Reece Thompson as Hiroshi
Sean Campbell as Shintaro Nozawa
Sylvia Zaradic as Chie Hirada
Trevor Devall as Photographer

Music 
Opening ThemeReal You, Another You, by Naoto Kine
Ending ThemeWinter Comes Around, by Akiko Hioki

References

External links
 

1994 anime films
Anime with original screenplays
Bandai Entertainment anime titles
Drama anime and manga
Fictional dogs
1990s Japanese-language films
Japanese animated films